Thomas de Multon may refer to:
 Thomas de Multon, 1st Baron Multon of Gilsland (1276–1313)
 Thomas de Multon, 1st Baron Multon of Egremont (died 1322)
 Thomas II de Multon (died 1271), Baron of Burgh and Gilsland

See also
 Thomas Moulton (disambiguation)